The 2018 FIFA World Cup qualification UEFA Group D was one of the nine UEFA groups for 2018 FIFA World Cup qualification. The group consisted of six teams: Wales, Austria, Serbia, Republic of Ireland, Moldova, and Georgia.

The draw for the first round (group stage) was held as part of the 2018 FIFA World Cup Preliminary Draw on 25 July 2015, starting 18:00 MSK (UTC+3), at the Konstantinovsky Palace in Strelna, Saint Petersburg, Russia.

The group winners, Serbia, qualified directly for the 2018 FIFA World Cup. The group runners-up, Republic of Ireland, advanced to the play-offs as one of the best eight runners-up.

Standings

Matches
The fixture list was confirmed by UEFA on 26 July 2015, the day following the draw. Times are CET/CEST, as listed by UEFA (local times are in parentheses).

Goalscorers
There were 71 goals scored in 30 matches, for an average of  goals per match.

6 goals

 Aleksandar Mitrović

4 goals

 Marko Arnautović
 James McClean
 Dušan Tadić
 Gareth Bale

3 goals

 Louis Schaub
 Valeri Qazaishvili
 Daryl Murphy

2 goals

 Martin Hinteregger
 Marc Janko
 Mijat Gaćinović
 Aleksandar Kolarov
 Filip Kostić
 Joe Allen
 Aaron Ramsey

1 goal

 Guido Burgstaller
 Martin Harnik
 Marcel Sabitzer
 Jano Ananidze
 Valerian Gvilia
 Nika Kacharava
 Giorgi Merebashvili
 Tornike Okriashvili
 Igor Bugaiov
 Alexandru Dedov
 Alexandru Gațcan
 Radu Gînsari
 Séamus Coleman
 Shane Duffy
 Jeff Hendrick
 Shane Long
 Jonathan Walters
 Branislav Ivanović
 Nemanja Matić
 Luka Milivojević
 Aleksandar Prijović
 Tom Lawrence
 Hal Robson-Kanu
 Sam Vokes
 Ben Woodburn

1 own goal

 Kevin Wimmer (against Wales)

Discipline
A player was automatically suspended for the next match for the following offences:
 Receiving a red card (red card suspensions could be extended for serious offences)
 Receiving two yellow cards in two different matches (yellow card suspensions were carried forward to the play-offs, but not the finals or any other future international matches)

The following suspensions were served during the qualifying matches:

Notes

References

External links

Qualifiers – Europe: Round 1, FIFA.com
FIFA World Cup, UEFA.com
Standings – Qualifying round: Group D, UEFA.com

D
Serbia at the 2018 FIFA World Cup